Richard Ernest Wycherley (18 February 1909 – 26 April 1986), was a classical archaeologist, specialising in ancient Greece. He attended Queens' College at the University of Cambridge and was Emeritus Professor of Greek at the University of Wales.

He was the author of the Companion Volume to the Loeb Edition of Pausanias, Description of Greece; How the Greeks Built Cities; The Athenian Agora III, Literary and Epigraphical Testimonia and The Stones of Athens. He was also co-author with Homer Thompson of The Athenian Agora XIV, The History, Shape and Uses of an Ancient City Center.

Publications
The Stones of Athens, Princeton University Press, 1978.
How the Greeks built cities, Macmillan, 1976.
The Agora of Athens: The History, Shape, and Uses of an Ancient City Center with Homer Thompson, American School of Classical Studies at Athens, 1972.
Athenian Agora III, Literary and Epigraphical Testimonia, American School of Classical Studies at Athens, 1957.

References

1909 births
1986 deaths
Alumni of Queens' College, Cambridge
People associated with the University of Wales
British archaeologists
20th-century archaeologists